Universidad Federico Henríquez y Carvajal (UFHEC) is a private university located in Santo Domingo in the Dominican Republic.

The university is coeducational institution located in the urban setting of the capital city of the Dominican Republic. It also has branch campuses in smaller Dominican communities such as La Romana, Baní and Moca. Universidad Federico Henriquez y Carvajal (UFHEC)  is recognized by the Ministerio de Educación Superior, Ciencia y Tecnología, República Dominicana (Ministry of Higher Education, Science and Technology of the Dominican Republic). UFHEC offers courses and programs leading to higher education degrees (i.e. certificates, diplomas, bachelor degrees) in several areas of study.

History
Universidad Federico Henríquez y Carvajal originally operated under the name Universidad Mundial Dominicana under the administration of Dr. Ronald Bauer. In 1988, due to irregular financial management, the National Council of Higher Education of the Dominican Republic (Consejo Nacional de Education Superior, CONES) assumed control of the school and put two former Universidad Mundial officials in charge. In 1991, CONES decided to change the name of the school to Universidad Federico Henriquez y Carvajal due to the damage done to the previous name. The CONES claimed that the new school was a separate entity rather than a continuation of the previous school.

The Miami New Times has reported that the school lured American chiropractors in the 1990s with the promise of a fast-track to a medical degree. The students were then provided with sub-par education that included only six weeks of basic medical education and nine months of clinical rotations

On July 31, 1998, the State of California in the United States of America, through the Medical Board and its Licensing Program, formally disapproved Universidad Federico Henriquez y Carvajal (UFHEC) graduates as eligible for medical licensure in that country. They stated that "neither education completed at, nor diplomas issued by, the school will be accepted toward meeting the requirements for training and/or medical licensure" in the state. In 1996, a United States federal judge ordered that "the eligibility of Universidad Federico Henriquez y Carvajal to participate in the United States student financial assistance programs authorized under Title IV of the Higher Education Act of 1965 be terminated" due to failure to develop a satisfactory academic progress policy and inappropriate need analysis for 11 recipients of Title IV student financial aid.

References

Universities in the Dominican Republic
Education in Santo Domingo